The 2011–12 Cupa României was the seventy-fourth season of the annual Romanian football knockout tournament. The winner of the competition qualified for the play-off round of the 2012–13 UEFA Europa League.

Round of 32 
The 14 winners of the fifth round entered in this round and were joined by the 18 teams from the 2011–12 Liga I.

Round of 16 
The 16 winners of the fifth phase entered in this round.

Quarterfinals 
The 8 winners of the fifth phase entered in this round.

Semifinals 
+

|}

First leg

Second leg

Final

References

Cupa
2012
2011–12 domestic association football cups